Toktogul (known until 31 July 1957 as Muztör), is a city (since 2012) in Jalal-Abad Region of Kyrgyzstan. Its population was 20,577 in 2021. It is the administrative seat of Toktogul District.

It is named after its most famous son: the poet and musician Toktogul Satilganov. Toktogul was born in Kushchusu, a village now submerged in the Toktogul Reservoir. It is located on the northern shore of the Toktogul reservoir. To the south, highway M41 curves around the eastern end of the reservoir toward Karaköl and Jalal-Abad city. To the north the road goes up the Chychkan valley into Talas Region on its way to Bishkek.

Population

References

Populated places in Jalal-Abad Region